Cerro Largo International Airport  is an airport serving Melo, capital of the Cerro Largo Department of Uruguay.

The Melo VOR-DME (Ident: MLO) and non-directional beacon (Ident: MO) are located on the field.

See also

Transport in Uruguay
List of airports in Uruguay

References

External links
OpenStreetMap - Cerro Largo International Airport
OurAirports - Cerro Largo International Airport

Airports in Uruguay
Buildings and structures in Cerro Largo Department
Melo, Uruguay